Spoils of Failure is the fourth and final album by Canadian band Buried Inside.

Track listing

Credits
M. Godbout – Drums
E. Sayer – Guitar     
N. Von Shaw – Vocals, Sampling
S. Martin - Bass guitar, Vocals
A. Tweedy - Guitar, Vocals
Produced by Kurt Ballou and Buried Inside
Recorded by Kurt Ballou at Godcity Studios
Additional recording by Matt Ouimet at The Resonator
Mixed by Matt Bayles at Red Room Recordings
Mastered by Alan Douches at West West Side
Artwork by Matias Palacios-Hardy
Strings arranged and performed by Mark Molnar

2009 albums
Albums produced by Kurt Ballou
Buried Inside albums
Relapse Records albums